Vexillum sykesi is a species of small sea snail, marine gastropod mollusk within the family Costellariidae, the ribbed miters.

Description
Vexillum sykesi can be found in Aruba, Belize, Bonaire, the Caribbean Sea, Costa Rica, Cuba, the Gulf of Mexico, the lesser Anitles, and Panama.

Distribution

References

sykesi
Gastropods described in 1925